Halaf-e Do (also Romanized as Ḩalāf-e Do; also known as Ḩalāf, Ḩeyf, and Khalaf) is a village in Elhayi Rural District, in the Central District of Ahvaz County, Khuzestan Province, Iran. At the 2006 census, its population was 319, in 47 families.

References 

Populated places in Ahvaz County